The Musquanousse River is a salmon river in the Côte-Nord region of Quebec, Canada. It flows south and empties into the Gulf of Saint Lawrence.

Location

In this section the river descends through falls and numerous rapids towards a broad T-shaped bay, which connects by a narrow neck with the Gulf.

It is in the municipality of Côte-Nord-du-Golfe-du-Saint-Laurent in Le Golfe-du-Saint-Laurent Regional County Municipality.

Name

In 1694 Louis Jolliet wrote of the Mascoüarou and smaller Mascoüarouchis rivers.
The name means "little river of the black bear tail".
The surveyor J. B. A. Gould gave the lake and river this name in 1899 in a survey report.
The Musquanousse River is also known as the "Little Musquaro River".

Description

The Dictionnaire des rivières et lacs de la province de Québec (1914) says of the river,

Basin

It lies between the basins of the Musquaro River to the west and the Washicoutai River to the east.
It is partly in the unorganized territory of Petit-Mécatina and partly in the municipality of Côte-Nord-du-Golfe-du-Saint-Laurent.
A map of the ecological regions of Quebec shows the Musquanousse River in sub-regions 6o-T, 6n-T and 6m-T of the east spruce/moss subdomain.
Wildlife in this mountainous landscape include Moose, bear, wolf and bald eagle.
The river is also frequented by bustards and ducks.

Fishing

The Musquanousse, including lakes Marie-Claire, Missu, Musquanousse and Des Outardes, is recognized as an Atlantic salmon river.
Between 2013 and 2017 an average of 24 salmon were reported caught each year.
All the lakes are accessible to salmon to varying degrees, and some reach Lake Musquanousse at the head of the river.
The stream is home to Atlantic salmon and brook trout, including anadromous and landlocked specimens of both species.
The Pourvoirie Musquanousse provides outfitter services.
It holds exclusive rights over the entire river and chain of lakes, as well as the estuary. 
There are nine pools for fishing salmon by wading or from boats.

Notes

Sources

Rivers of Côte-Nord